General elections were held in Liechtenstein on 5 February 2017 to elect the 25 members of the Landtag.

Background
In the 2013 elections the Progressive Citizens' Party lost one seat, and the Patriotic Union lost five seats while The Independents gained four seats, and the Free List gained two seats. This was the first time in Liechtenstein's history that four parties held seats in the Landtag.

Electoral system
The 25 members of the Landtag were elected by open list proportional representation from two constituencies, Oberland with 15 seats and Unterland with 10 seats. The electoral threshold was 8%.

Campaign
The 2017 general election saw the highest number of candidates running in Liechtenstein's history with 71 candidates.

Results
The Progressive Citizens' Party lost one seat and the Independents gained one seat. Both the Patriotic Union and the Free List retained all their seats. Voter turnout was 77.8%, down from  79.8% in 2013.

By electoral district

References

Liechtenstein
General
Elections in Liechtenstein
Liechtenstein